The oath of office of the president of the United States is the oath or affirmation that the president of the United States takes upon assuming office. The wording of the oath is specified in Article II, Section One, Clause 8, of the United States Constitution, and a new president must take it before exercising or carrying out any official powers or duties.

This clause is one of three oath or affirmation clauses in the Constitution, but it is the only one that actually specifies the words that must be spoken. Article I, Section 3 requires Senators, when sitting to try impeachments, to be "on Oath or Affirmation." Article VI, Clause 3, similarly requires the persons specified therein to "be bound by oath or affirmation, to support this Constitution." The presidential oath requires much more than that general oath of allegiance and fidelity. This clause enjoins the new president to swear or affirm: "I will to the best of my ability, preserve, protect and defend the Constitution of the United States."

Text

Ceremony 

A newly elected or re-elected president of the United States begins their four-year term of office at noon on the twentieth day of January following the election, and, by tradition, takes the oath of office during an inauguration on that date; prior to 1937 the president's term of office began on March 4. If January 20 falls on a Sunday, the president will be sworn in that day by taking the oath privately, but will then re-take the oath in a public ceremony the next day, on January 21.

Nine vice presidents have succeeded to the presidency upon the death or resignation of the president. In these situations the oath of office was administered to the new president as quickly as possible, as doing so allowed the presidency to continue uninterrupted.

Administration 

While the Constitution does not mandate that anyone in particular should administer the presidential oath of office, it has been administered by the chief justice beginning with John Adams, except following the death of a sitting president. George Washington was sworn into office during his first inauguration, on April 30, 1789, by Chancellor of New York Robert Livingston. William Cranch, chief judge of the U.S. Circuit Court, administered the oath to Millard Fillmore on July 10, 1850, when he became president after the death of Zachary Taylor. Upon being informed of Warren Harding's death, while visiting his family home in Plymouth Notch, Vermont, Calvin Coolidge was sworn in as president by his father, John Calvin Coolidge Sr., a notary public. Federal Judge Sarah T. Hughes administered the oath of office to Lyndon B. Johnson aboard Air Force One after John F. Kennedy's assassination on November 22, 1963; the only time a woman has administered the oath of office. Overall, the presidential oath has been administered by 15 chief justices (one of whom—William Howard Taft—was also a former president), one associate justice, four federal judges, two New York state judges, and one notary public.

Option of affirmation 
The Constitutional language gives the option to "affirm" instead of "swear." While the reasons for this are not documented, it may relate to certain Christians, including Quakers, who apply this scripture literally: "But above all things, my brethren, swear not, neither by heaven, neither by the earth, neither by any other oath: but let your yea be yea; and your nay, nay; lest ye fall into condemnation" (James 5:12, KJV). Franklin Pierce was the only president known to use the word "affirm" rather than "swear." Herbert Hoover is often listed to have used "affirm" as well, owing to his being a Quaker, but a newsreel taken of the ceremony indicates that the words used were "solemnly swear." Richard Nixon, who was also a Quaker, swore, rather than affirmed.

Forms 
There have been two forms of administering, and taking, the oath of office.

Under the first form, now in disuse, the administrator articulated the constitutional oath in the form of a question, and modifying the wording from the first to the second person, as in, "Do you, George Washington, solemnly swear ..." and then requested an affirmation. At that point a response of "I do" or "I swear" completed the oath.

It is believed that this was the common procedure at least until the early 20th century. In 1881, the New York Times article covering the swearing in of Chester A. Arthur, reported that he responded to the question of accepting the oath with the words, "I will, so help me God." In 1929, Time magazine reported that the Chief Justice William H. Taft began the oath uttering, "You, Herbert Hoover, do you solemnly swear ...", Hoover replied with a simple "I do."

Under the second, and current form, the administrator articulates the oath in the affirmative, and in the first person, so that the president takes the oath by repeating it verbatim.  Franklin Roosevelt, in 1933, stood silent as Chief Justice Charles Evans Hughes recited the entire oath, then repeated that oath from beginning to end himself.  By the time of Harry Truman's inauguration in 1949, the practice was for the chief justice to utter the oath in phrases, with the president repeating those phrases, until the oath was completed.

Use of Bibles 

By convention, incoming presidents raise their right hand and place the left on a Bible while taking the oath of office. In 1789, George Washington took the oath of office with an altar Bible borrowed from the St. John's Lodge No. 1, Ancient York Masons lodge in New York, and he kissed the Bible afterward. Subsequent presidents up to and including Harry S. Truman, followed suit. Dwight D. Eisenhower said a prayer in the end instead of kissing the Bible in 1953.

Theodore Roosevelt did not use the Bible when taking the oath in 1901, nor did John Quincy Adams, who swore on a book of law, with the intention that he was swearing on the constitution. Lyndon B. Johnson was sworn in on a Roman Catholic missal on Air Force One. Harry Truman, Dwight Eisenhower, Richard Nixon, George H. W. Bush, Barack Obama and Donald Trump each swore the oath on two Bibles. The large leather-bound Bible used by Joe Biden had been in the Biden family since 1893.

"So help me God" 

The First Congress explicitly prescribed the phrase "So help me God" in oaths under the Judiciary Act of 1789 for all U.S. judges and officers other than the president. It was prescribed even earlier under the various first state constitutions as well as by the Second Continental Congress in 1776. Although the phrase is mandatory in these oaths, the said Act also allows for the option that the phrase be omitted by the officer, in which case it would be called an affirmation instead of an oath: "Which words, so help me God, shall be omitted in all cases where an affirmation is admitted instead of an oath." In contrast, the oath of the president is the only oath specified in the Constitution. It does not include the closing phrase "So help me God," and it also allows for the optional form of an affirmation which is not considered an oath. In practice, most presidents, at least during the last century, have opted to take the oath (rather than an affirmation), to use a Bible to do so, and also to close the oath with the customary phrase.

There is currently debate as to whether or not George Washington, the first president, added the phrase to his acceptance of the oath. The earliest known source indicating Washington added "So help me God" to his acceptance, not to the oath, is attributed to Washington Irving, aged six at the time of the inauguration, and first appears 65 years after the event. The only contemporary account that repeats the oath in full, a report from the French consul, Comte de Moustier, states only the constitutional oath, without reference to Washington's adding "So help me God" to his acceptance.

The historical debate over who first used "So help me God" is marred by ignoring the two forms of giving the oath. The first, now in disuse, is when the administrator articulates the constitutional oath in the form of a question, as in, "Do you George Washington solemnly swear ...", requesting an affirmation. At that point a response of "I do" or "I swear" completes the oath. Without verbatim transcripts, the scant existing evidence shows this was the common procedure at least until the early 20th century. In 1865 the Sacramento Daily Union covered the second inauguration of Abraham Lincoln. Lincoln finished his oath with "So help me God," and he kissed the Bible. The Daily Union account is embellished in several ways, and other newspaper accounts published nearer to the ceremony do not mention the phrase. In 1881, the New York Times article covering the swearing in of Chester A. Arthur reported that he responded to the question of accepting the oath with the words, "I will, so help me God." In 1929, Time magazine reported that the chief justice began the oath uttering, "You, Herbert Hoover, do you solemnly swear ..." Hoover replied with a simple "I do."

A contemporaneous newspaper account of Lincoln's 1865 inauguration states that Lincoln appended the phrase "So help me God" to the oath. This newspaper report is followed by another account, provided later in the same year after Lincoln's death (April 15, 1865), that Lincoln said "So help me God" during his oath. The evidence pertaining to the 1865 inauguration is much stronger than that pertaining to Lincoln's 1861 use of the phrase. Several sources claim that Lincoln said "So help me God" at his 1861 inauguration, yet these sources were not contemporaneous to the event. During the speech, Lincoln stated that his oath was "registered in Heaven," something some have taken as indicating he likely uttered the phrase "So help me God." Conversely, there was a claim made by A. M. Milligan (a Presbyterian minister who advocated for an official Christian U.S. government) that letters were sent to Abraham Lincoln asking him to swear to God during his inaugurations, and Lincoln allegedly wrote back saying that God's name was not in the Constitution, and he could not depart from the letter of that instrument.

All federal judges and executive officers were required as early as 1789 by statute to include the phrase unless they affirmed, in which case the phrase must be omitted. Given that nearly every president-elect since President Franklin D. Roosevelt has recited the additional phrase, it is likely that the majority of presidents-elect have uttered it.

Mishaps 

 In 1909, when President William Howard Taft was sworn in, Chief Justice Melville Fuller misquoted the oath, but the error was not publicized at the time. The mistake was similar to the one Taft himself would make twenty years later when, as Chief Justice, he swore in President Hoover. Recalling the incident, Taft wrote, "When I was sworn in as president by Chief Justice Fuller, he made a similar slip," and added, "but in those days when there was no radio, it was observed only in the Senate chamber where I took the oath."
 In 1929, Chief Justice Taft, himself formerly a president of the United States, garbled the oath when he swore in President Herbert Hoover using the words "preserve, maintain, and defend the Constitution," instead of "preserve, protect, and defend." The error was picked up by schoolgirl Helen Terwilliger on the radio. Taft eventually acknowledged his error, but did not think it was important, and Hoover did not retake the oath. In Taft's view, his departure from the text did not invalidate the oath.
 In 1945, President Harry S. Truman's bare initial caused an unusual slip when he first became president and took the oath. At a meeting in the Cabinet Room, Chief Justice Harlan Stone, apparently mistaken about the meaning of Truman's middle initial (which is not an abbreviation but rather the whole middle name in itself), began reading the oath by saying "I, Harry Shipp Truman, ..." Truman responded: "I, Harry S Truman, ..."
 In both his 1953 and 1957 inaugurations, Dwight D. Eisenhower read the line "the office of President of the United States" as "the office of the President of the United States," even as chief justices Fred Vinson (in 1953) and Earl Warren (in 1957) said the line correctly.
 In 1965, Chief Justice Earl Warren prompted Lyndon B. Johnson to say, "the Office of the Presidency of the United States."
 In 1973, President Richard Nixon added the word "and" between "preserve" and "protect," resulting in "preserve and protect, and defend the Constitution of the United States."  Nixon had recited the line correctly during his first inauguration.
 In 2009, Chief Justice John Roberts, while administering the oath to Barack Obama, incorrectly recited part of the oath. Roberts prompted, "That I will execute the Office of President to the United States faithfully." Obama stopped at "execute," and waited for Roberts to correct himself. Roberts, after a false start, then followed Obama's "execute" with "faithfully," which results in "execute faithfully," which is also incorrect. Obama then repeated Roberts' initial, incorrect prompt, with the word "faithfully" after "United States." The oath was re-administered the next day by Roberts at the White House.

List of ceremonies 

Since the office of President of the United States came into existence in 1789 there have been 59 public swearing-in ceremonies to mark the commencement of a new four-year presidential term, plus an additional nine marking the start of a partial presidential term following the intra-term death or resignation of an incumbent president. With the 2021 inauguration of Joe Biden, the presidential oath has been taken 76 different times by 45  persons. This numerical discrepancy results chiefly from two factors: a president must take the oath at the beginning of each term of office, and, because Inauguration Day has sometimes fallen on a Sunday, five presidents have taken the oath privately before the public inauguration ceremony. In addition, three have repeated the oath as a precaution against potential later constitutional challenges.

Notes

See also 
 Presidential Succession Act
 Oath of office of the vice president of the United States
 United States presidential transition

References

External links 

 Forrest Church, Ph.D., "Did George Washington Say 'So Help Me God'?"
  Video of inaugurations from Franklin D. Roosevelt – Barack H. Obama

Presidency of the United States
United States presidential history
United States presidential inaugurations
Clauses of the United States Constitution
US president
Articles containing video clips